Thomas Riley was an Irish-born Corporal in the United States Army who earned the Medal of Honor for gallantry during the American Civil War. On 4 April 1865, Riley captured the flag of the 6th Alabama Cavalry. For this action, he was awarded the Medal of Honor on 8 June 1865.

Military service 
Riley enlisted in New Orleans served with Company D of the 1st Louisiana Cavalry Regiment. He was a private for most of his service, including during the action from which he received his Medal of Honor. On 4 April 1865, during the Battle of Fort Blakely near Fort Blakely, Alabama, Riley captured the flag of the 6th Alabama Cavalry Regiment.

Riley's Medal of Honor citation reads:

References 

American Civil War recipients of the Medal of Honor
United States Army Medal of Honor recipients
Year of birth unknown
Year of death unknown